The following is a discography of production credited to Diamond D.

1988

Raheem 
 "I'm the King"

1990

Ultimate Force - I'm Not Playin' 

 01. "Another Hit" (Co-produced by Jazzy Jay)
 02. "C'Mon" (feat. Fat Joe)
 03. "Girls"
 04. "I Gotta Go"
 05. "I'm in Effect"
 06. "Oh, Shit" (feat. Gizmo, Saladeem, Fat Joe, Kid Sevill)
 08. "One of the All-Time Greats" (Co-produced by Jazzy Jay)
 09. "Revolution of the Mind"
 10. "Smooth as Suede"
 11. "Supreme Diamond D" (Co-produced by Jazzy Jay)
 12. "Tuff (So Damn)"

Lord Finesse & DJ Mike Smooth  – Funky Technician
 03. "Funky Technician"
 05. "Here I Come"
 07. "I Keep the Crowd Listening"
 08. "Bad Mutha"
 09. "Keep It Flowing"

1992

Showbiz & AG  
 "I'm Convinced" (previously unreleased)

Lord Finesse – Return of the Funky Man
 06. "Praise the Lord"  
 09. "Isn't He Something"  
 13. "That's How Smooth I Am"  
 15. "Fuck 'Em"
 "Praise The Lord (Remix)"

Ghetto Girlz - Ain't Takin No S@#t 
 04. "That's What She Wrote"
 05. "Marked For Death"
 06. "Alphabetical Order"
 08. "Bitch Ass Nigger"

Busy Bee - Thank God For Busy Bee 
 02. "Get With Me"
 10. "Home Boyz"
 12. "I Got Things Sewed"
 14. "My Personality"

Showbiz & AG - Runaway Slave 
 08. "Hard To Kill" (Co-produced by Showbiz)  
 14. "Soul Clap (Short Version)" (Co-produced by Showbiz)

Diamond D - Stunts, Blunts and Hip Hop 
 01. "Intro"
 02. "Best-Kept Secret"
 03. "Sally Got a One-Track Mind"
 04. "Step to Me" (Co-produced by Showbiz) 
 05. "Shut the Fuck Up" (Co-produced by Showbiz) 
 06. "Fuck What U Heard" (Co-produced by Sadat X) 
 07. "I'm Outta Here" (Co-produced by Showbiz) 
 08. "A Day in the Life"
 09. "Last Car on the 2 Train"
 10. "Red Light, Green Light"
 11. "I Went for Mine" (Co-produced by Jazzy Jay) 
 12. "Comments from Big L and Showbiz"
 13. "Check One, Two" (Co-produced by The 45 King) 
 14. "What You Seek"
 15. "Lunchroom Chatter"
 16. "Confused"
 17. "Pass Dat Shit"
 18. "Freestyle (Yo, That's That Shit)" (Co-produced by Large Professor) 
 19. "K.I.S.S. (Keep It Simple Stupid)" (Co-produced by Q-Tip) 
 20. "Stunts, Blunts & Hip Hop"
 21. "Wuffman Stressed Out"
 22. "Feel the Vibe" (Co-produced by Showbiz) 
 23. "A View From the Underground"
 "Best Kept Secret (Remix) by The45 King & Diamond D)"

The A.T.E.E.M. 
 "Yeah (Diamond Mix)"

Mi Jette & Money Mark – U Want Me Back 12" 
 A1. "U Want Me Back"

R.O.C. 
 "Dedicated to My Girl (Diamond Mix)"

Brand Nubian - Punks Jump Up to Get Beat Down 12" 
 B1. "Punks Jump Up to Get Beat Down (Remix)"

1993

Brand Nubian - In God We Trust 
 14. "Punks Jump Up to Get Beat Down"

Diamond D - I'm Outta Here (Remix) 12" 
 A1. "I'm Outta Here (Remix)"
 B1. "You Can't Front" (feat. Lord Finesse & Sadat X) (Co-produced by Buckwild)

Apache - Apache Ain't Shit 
 10. "Who Freaked Who" (featuring Nikki D)
 11. "Get Ya Weight Up"

Fat Joe - Represent 
 04. "Bad Bad Man" 
 05. "Watch The Sound" (featuring Grand Puba & Diamond D)
 06. "Flow Joe" 
 07. "Da Fat Gangsta" 
 08. "Shorty Gotta Fat Ass"
 10. "You Must Be Out Of Your Fuckin' Mind" (featuring Apache & Kool G Rap)
 13. "Get On Up"

Cypress Hill 
 "When The Ship Goes Down (Diamond Mix)"

Illegal - The Untold Truth 
 02. "Illegal Will Rock"
 04. "CrumbSnatcher"
 "We Getz Buzy (Remix)"

Ed O.G. and Da Bulldogs - Roxbury 02119 
 01. "Streets Of The Ghetto"
 02. "Busted"
 03. "Love Comes And Goes"
 05. "I Thought Ya Knew"
 10. "Dat Ain't Right"

Red Hot Lover Tone 
 "Give It Up (Remix)"

Yaggfu Front 
 "Slappin' Suckas Silly (Remix)"

Raazda Rukkuz - Da Chronic Asthmatics / Loco Impact 12" 
 A1. "Da Chronic Asthmatics"
 B1. "Loco Impact"

Private Investigators 
 "Who Am I? (God) (Remix)"

Leaders of the New School - Classic Material / Spontaneous (13 MC's Deep!) 12" 
 A2. "Classic Material (Remix)"

Class A Felony – Class A Felony 
 17. "I Can't Take No More" (feat. Diamond D and Lakim Shabazz

1994

Fu-Schnickens - Nervous Breakdown 
 05. "Aaahh Ooohhh!"  
 06. "Sneakin' Up on Ya"

A.D.O.R. - The Concrete 
 05. "Day 2 Day"
 09. "Keep It Real"
 11. "The Kid Is Crazy"
 13. "Heart And Soul"

Shadz Of Lingo -  A View To A Kill 
 01. "Different Stylez"
 03. "Ill & Get Clowned"
 07. "Think I Give A F-K"
 08. "Don't Test Da Skillz"

Nefertiti - L.I.F.E. 
 05. "Family Tree"
 10. "Come Down Baby"

House of Pain - Same as It Ever Was 
 07. "Word is Bond"
 "Word is Bond (Remix)"

Justice System 
 "Dedication to Bambaata (Remix)"

Dana Barros & Cedric Ceballos 
 "Ya Don't Stop" (feat. A.G. and Brand Nubian)

Outkast 
 "SouthernPlayalistiCadillacMuzik (Remix)"

Scientifik - Criminal 
 02. "I Got Planz"
 05. "Yeah Daddy"

The Veldt 
 "Soul in a Jar (Guitar Mix)"

Joi 
 "Freedom" (feat. Shadez of Lingo)

Total Devastation 
 "Wonderful World of Skins (Remix)"

Lucas 
 "Cityzen (Diamond D Remix)"

Terror Tongue 
 "Lyrical Threat" (unreleased)

1995

Red Hot Lover Tone - #1 Player 
 02. "#1 Player"
 11. "Bust Tha Maneuva"

The Pharcyde - Labcabincalifornia 
 03. "Groupie Therapy"

KRS-One - KRS-One 
 11. "Build Ya Skillz"
 13. "Squash All Beef"
 "What I Know" (unreleased outtake)

KRS-One 
 "Ah Yeah (Diamond Flava)" 
 "Ah Yeah (Diamond Rhode Mix)"

Fat Joe - Jealous One's Envy 
 01. "Bronx Tale" (featuring KRS-One)
 11. "Watch Out" (featuring Armageddon, Big Pun & Keith Nut)

Tha Alkaholiks - Coast II Coast 
 03. "Let It Out"
 11. "The Next Level" (Co-produced by E-Swift)

Urban Thermo Dynamics 
 "Manifest Destiny"

Big C - D&D Project 
 "Look Alive"

Big Red - Created A Monster 12" 
 A1. "Created A Monster"
 B1. "How They Want It" (feat. Diamond D)

Various artists - Freedom (Theme From Panther) 12" 
 A1. "Freedom (Theme From Panther) (Diamond D's Crystal Mix)"

1996

Fugees - The Score 
 09. "The Score" (featuring Diamond D)

Raekwon 
 "Rainy Dayz (Mr. Dalvin Remix)" (feat. Ghostface Killah & Jodeci) (co-production, programming & mixing)

Xzibit - At the Speed of Life 
10. "Bird's Eye View"

Sadat X - Wild Cowboys 
 02. "Wild Cowboys"
 09. "Petty People"
 12. "Move On"

Various artists - America is Dying Slowly 
 14. "Stay Away From The Nasty Hoes" (performed by Sadat X, Fat Joe, & Diamond D)

Mondo Grosso 
 "Do You See What I See (Remix)"

Ras Kass - Soul On Ice Remix / Marinatin' 12" 
 A2. "Soul On Ice Remix"

Party Arty 
 "Enjoy Yourself"

Various artists - The New Groove: The Blue Note Remix Project 
 07. "Summer Song (Diamond D Remix)" (performed by Ronnie Foster)

1997

Organized Konfusion - The Equinox 
 05. "Questions"

D.I.T.C. - Day One 12" 
 "Day One"

Diamond D - Hatred, Passions and Infidelity 
 01. "Intro" (performed by Kid Capri and Busta Rhymes)
 02. "Flowin'" (feat. John Dough)
 03. "MC Iz My Ambition" (feat. Don Barron)
 04. "No Wonduh (The Projects)"
 05. "The Hiatus"
 07. "Painz & Strife" (feat. Pete Rock and Phife Dawg)
 08. "Can't Keep My Grands to Myself" (feat. Mark-Lo and Paradise)
 10. "This One" (feat. Busta Rhymes)
 11. "Never" (feat. Sadat X and K. Terroribul)
 12. "Cream N Sunshine" (feat. Veronica)
 13. "Gather Round"
 14. "K.T." (performed by K. Terroribul)
 16. "Epilogue"

Afro Jazz 
 "Paria v/s Estat"

1998

Busta Rhymes - Extinction Level Event (Final World Front) 
 17. "What the Fuck You Want!!"

Queen Latifah - Order in the Court 
 13. "I Don't Know" (featuring Sisqó)

Brand Nubian - Foundation 
 19. "Foundation"

D.I.T.C. 
 "I Flip Styles" (feat. Brand Nubian)

Scaramanga - 7 Eyes, 7 Horns 
 03. S.I.R.

A.D.O.R. - The Rush / Ruthless Confrontation 12" 
 A1. "The Rush"

1999

Mos Def - Black on Both Sides 
 02. "Hip Hop"

Too Short - Can't Stay Away 
 04. "Here We Go" (featuring Jay-Z and Jermaine Dupri)

Pharoahe Monch - Internal Affairs 
 11. "The Ass" (featuring Apani B. Fly)
 12. "The Light" 
 14. "The Truth" (featuring Common and Talib Kweli)

Various artists - Violator: The Album 
 18. "Bus-A-Bus (Remix)" (performed by Busta Rhymes)

A.G. - The Dirty Version 
 06. "No Where to Go" (feat. A.G., Kool Chuck and Diamond D)

Various artists - Soundbombing 2 
 21. "When It Pours It Rains" (performed by Diamond D)

Diamond D - Feel It 12" 
 "Feel It" (feat. Sadat X)

2000

Freddie Foxxx - Industry Shakedown 
 11. "Bumpy, Bring it Home"

D.I.T.C. - D.I.T.C. 
 07. "Foundation"

Sadat X - State of NY vs. Derek Murphy 
 01. "X-Man"
 06. "You Can't Deny"

A.D.O.R. - Animal 2000 
 05. "Cock'd Back"

Unbound Allstars 
 "Mumia 911"

2001

Busta Rhymes - Genesis 
 13. "Wife In Law" (featuring Jaheim)

Muro 
 "Lyrical Tyrants (Diamond Mix)" (feat. O.C.)

2002

The 45 King 
 "Double Dare"

2003

Diamond D - Grown Man Talk 
 01. "Intro"
 02. "Time Will Heal U"
 03. "Da Magnificent"
 04. "Like Us"
 05. "In Da BX"
 06. "Why Yawl Hatin"
 07. "Watch Me"
 08. "Put it Down"
 09. "Live My Life"
 11. "I Know You Really Want It"
 12. "Don't Mean Shit 2 Me"
 13. "If I Were Ya Woman"
 14. "So Lovely"
 15. "2 Late"
 16. "Love"
 17. "50 Wayz"

Akrobatik - Balance 
 07. "Feedback" (feat. Diamond D)

ASD 
 "Sag Mir Wo Die Party Ist"

2004

Ed O.G. Featuring Pete Rock - My Own Worst Enemy 
 05. "Streets Is Callin'" (feat. Jaysaun and Diamond D)

The Omen - DJ Rhetmatic Mixtape 
 "It's Our World"

2005

Sadat X - Experience & Education 
 06. "The Great Diamond D" (feat. Heltah Skeltah)

Earatik Statik - Feelin' Earatik 
 12. "People Like US" (feat. Pacewon)

A.D.O.R. - Signature of Ill 
 06. "The Realness"
 08. "Signature Of The Ill"

Medina Green 
 "Green Boogie"

2006

Sadat X - Black October 
 03. "The Post"

Cannonball Adderley 
 "Bohemia in the Dark (Remix)"

2007

Sean Price - Master P 
 09. "Get It Together" (feat. Diamond D)

2008

Diamond D - The Huge Hefner Chronicles 
 06. "Good Tymez"
 10. "When Ur Hot Ur Hot"
 11. "I Wanna Leave"

2009

Collective Efforts - Freezing World 
 04. "I Get Down"

Freestyle Professors - Gryme Tyme 
 17. "Think About It"

2011

Pharoahe Monch - W.A.R. (We Are Renegades) 
 08. "Shine" (featuring Mela Machinko)

J-Live - S.P.T.A. (Said Person of That Ability) 
 07. "No Time To Waste"

Torae - For the Record 
 08. "Changes"

2013

Fat Joe - The Darkside III 
 07. "Cypher" (feat. Nick Shades)

2014

D.I.T.C. - The Remix Project 
 02. "Internationally Known (Diamond D Remix)"

Bigrec - DoomsDay 
 01. "The Dawning"
 02. "Bullseye"
 03. "If U Believe" (feat. Blake Moses)
 04. "Unstoppable"
 05. "NO 2 NC" (feat. Shred TVT)
 06. "Abomination"
 07. "Calisthenics"
 08. "DoomsDay"
 09. "I Cried" (feat. Jawz Of Life)
 10. "New Order" (feat. TH5PENTAGON)
 11. "Be Strong"
 12. "Nowhere To Run"
 13. "The Dumb Out" (feat. RA The Rugged Man)

Various artists - Coalmine Records Presents: Unearthed 
 20. "Boyz II Men (Diamond D Remix)" (performed by Blu and Nottz)

Dilated Peoples - Directors of Photography 
 09. "Let Your Thoughts Fly Away"

Diamond D - The Diam Piece 
 01. "Rap Life" (featuring Pharoahe Monch)
 02. "Where's the Love" (featuring Talib Kweli, Elzhi and Skyzoo)
 03. "It's Nothin'" (featuring Fat Joe, Chi Ali and Freddie Foxxx)
 04. "Only Way 2 Go" (featuring Pete Rock)
 05. "Hard Days" (featuring The Pharcyde)
 06. "I Ain't the One To Fuc Wit" (featuring Scram Jones)
 07. "Pump Ya Brakes" (featuring Rapsody, Boog Brown and Stacy Epps)
 08. "Take Em Off da Map" (featuring Black Rob)
 09. "We Are the People of the World" (featuring Kurupt and Tha Alkaholiks)
 10. "Jose Feliciano" 
 11. "Handz Up" (featuring Hi-Tek)
 12. "Pain" (featuring A.G. and Chino XL)
 13. "Vanity" (featuring Nottz)
 14. "It's Magic" (featuring Step Brothers)
 15. "The Game" (featuring Grand Daddy I.U.)
 16. "Let the Music Talk" (featuring Kev Brown)
 17. "Ace of Diamonds" (featuring Masta Ace)
 18. "187" (featuring Guilty Simpson and Ras Kass)

Diamond District - March on Washington (Redux) 
 08. "Everything (Diamond D Remix)"

2015

eMC - The Tonite Show 
 04. "The Monologue"

The Regiment - The aRchives 
 02. "Four Finger Ring Music" (featuring Diamond D)

2016

D.I.T.C. - D.I.T.C. Studios 
 09. "Brolic" (featuring A.G., O.C. and Diamond D)

Sadat X - Agua 
 05. "Head Shot"

2017

Showbiz and A.G. - Take It Back 
 11. "Breathe Easy"

Sadat X - The Sum of a Man 
 01. "The Devil Is Near" (featuring Jawz of Life)
 02. "Neva" (featuring Timmy Hunter)
 03. "Good Inside"
 04. "Out of Bounds" (featuring Diamond D)
 05. "Always Be My Lady" (featuring Raheem DeVaughn)
 06. "Yawl Can't Drink with Us" (featuring Kurupt & Tha Alkaholiks)
 07. "Celebrate"
 08. "Who's Judging" (featuring Tony Sunshine)
 09. "Bang Bang"
 10. "Get Away"
 11. "The Five Boroughs"
 12. "Reflections"

References

Production discographies
Hip hop discographies
Discographies of American artists